The Nissan MR engine family consists of straight-four 16-valve all-aluminium automobile engines with variable valve timing co-developed by Renault and Nissan. Renault calls it the M engine. Other noteworthy features of this engine family include acoustically equal runner lengths and a tumble control valve for the intake manifold, a "silent" timing chain, mirror finished crankshaft and camshaft journals, and offset cylinder placement in an attempt for increased efficiency.

The MR engine family features 'under stress' manufacture, meaning while the block is being bored, a torque plate puts the block under stress. The block becomes temporarily distorted until the head is torqued onto it, at which point the block is pulled into the correct shape.



MR16DDT (Renault M5Mt)
It was first introduced in the Nissan Juke small SUV in the autumn of 2010. In 2015, the Nissan Teana received this 1.6 Turbo as a replacement for the earlier 2.0-liter naturally aspirated engine.

Some of the pertinent features of the MR16DDT are:
 Twin variable valve timing control (CVTCS on intake and exhaust valves)
 Turbo-charged and intercooled
 Compression ratio of 9.5:1
 Lightweight design and reduced frictions

Applications:
2011–present Nissan Juke 
2013-2015 Nissan Juke NISMO (V1 Engine) 
2013–present Nissan Tiida (hatchback)/Nissan Pulsar/Nissan Sylphy
2012 Nissan Deltawing Race car (not production) ( at 7400 rpm)
2015–present Renault Sport Clio TROPHY  and 
2013–present Renault Samsung SM5 TCE
2015–present Nissan X-Trail
2015–present Nissan Teana L33 
2015–present Renault Talisman TCE  or 
2016–present Renault Samsung SM6 TCE 
2016–present Renault Mégane#Mégane GT 
2017–present Nissan Sentra SR Turbo & NISMO 
2017–2018 Renault Kadjar TCe 160

MR18DE

From July 6, 2006 this engine is also fitted to Nissan Livina Geniss for China version and the Nissan Grand Livina for Indonesia and Malaysia.

For Brazil, this engine is fitted to the Tiida and Livina ranges, with Flex-fuel capability.

Applications:

 2004–2012 Nissan Tiida/Versa
 2006–2019 Nissan Grand Livina
 2006–present Nissan Wingroad
 2009-2014 Nissan Cube

MRA8DE

The MRA8DE is a  engine, different from the MR18DE as it has a twin variable valve timing system on both the intake and exhaust valves and uses a diamond-like carbon coating.

Applications:
2013–present Nissan Sylphy B17 (Asian)/Nissan Sentra (North America and Middle east)/Nissan Pulsar (Australasia)

MR18DDT (Renault M5Pt)

The MR18DDT is a  engine, different from the MR18DE and MRA8DE as it has a turbocharged, twin variable valve timing system on both the intake and exhaust valves and uses a diamond-like carbon coating. It is used in the Renault and Alpine vehicles since 2015, where it is named M5Pt.

Applications:
2015–present Renault Espace V Energy TCe 225 EDC7
2015–present Renault Talisman EDC FAP
2017–present Renault Megane IV RS280 (Sport and Cup), Megane R.S. 300 Trophy
2017–present Alpine A110 (2017)

MR20DE (Renault M4R)

The MR20DE, a  engine, was the first MR series engine developed by Nissan as a replacement for the QR20DE. It is an undersquare engine, its bore and stroke being . It was first introduced in the Lafesta and Serena MPVs and Renault Samsung SM5 in early 2005. In November 2006, it entered Renault's lineup in the Clio III as the M4R, where it generates .

This engine is available with Nissan's XTRONIC CVT continuously variable transmission in several applications.

Applications:
2005–present Nissan Serena
2005–present Renault Samsung SM5
2005–2012 Nissan Bluebird Sylphy
2006–present Renault Clio
2007–present Nissan X-Trail
2007–present Nissan Qashqai
2007–2012 Nissan Sentra
2007–2015 Renault Laguna
2008–2014 Nissan Teana(J32)
2008–present Renault Safrane
2008–2016 Renault Mégane(III)
2009–present Renault Scénic
2009–present Renault Fluence
2014–2016 Renault Koleos (First generation)
2009–present Renault Samsung SM3
2009–present Renault Latitude
2013–present Nissan NV200
2013–present Nissan Sentra (Brazil only - Flex Fuel (gasoline and ethanol)
2015–present Renault Kadjar (China)

MR20DD (Renault M5R)

The MR20DD is a  engine developed by Nissan with direct injection and twin variable valve timing control. In 2016, it entered Renault's lineup in the Koleos II as the M5R, where it generates .

Applications:

2010–present Nissan Serena
2013–present Nissan X-Trail
2014–present Australian & New Zealand Markets Nissan Qashqai
2016-present Renault Koleos II
2017-present Renault Samsung QM6
2017-present Nissan Rogue Sport
2020-present Nissan Sentra

MR20DD Hybrid

The MR20DD Hybrid is a  Hybrid engine developed by Nissan with direct injection and twin variable valve timing control.

Applications:

2013–present Nissan X-Trail Hybrid

MR20DD S-Hybrid
The MR20DD S-Hybrid is a  Hybrid engine developed by Nissan with direct injection and twin variable valve timing control.

Applications:

2012–present Nissan Serena S-Hybrid

M9 diesel
The M9R and M9T are a family of straight-four 16-valve turbocharged diesel engines co-developed by Nissan and/or Renault, and also Mercedes-Benz Group in the case of the M9T/OM699. Following Renault's designation plan, the last letter (M9R resp. M9T) is to indicate the swept volume of 2.0 L resp. 2.3 litres. Despite the similar names, the diesel engines are only loosely related to the MR gasoline engines. As of late 2018, a new version of the M9R using adBlue and with slightly different internal dimensions replaced the original M9R.

Features of the diesel engines include a cast-iron block, aluminium alloy cylinder head with double overhead camshafts, 16-valve layout and a bushes timing chain. The M9T is directed to heavier vehicles like the Nissan Navara or the Renault Master.

Low output versions of the M9R for the Renault Trafic II at  had been replaced by the Renault R engine with the introduction of the Trafic III, while versions starting from  include VNT chargers. During production period engines had been updated up to Euro 6 (in early 2017).

M9R

The M9R is a  16-valve turbocharged diesel engine developed by the Renault–Nissan Alliance, and first installed in the Renault Laguna in 2006. It is available in the  tune in Nissan Qashqai, Nissan X-Trail, Renault Mégane, Renault Koleos and Renault Laguna models. A  form with particulate filter is available in Renault Laguna and Nissan X-Trail models. A  variant is also available on the Laguna GT. In both engines maximum power is achieved at 3750 rpm and maximum torque is available from 1750 rpm.

In order to reduce vibrations, balance shafts are included in some versions of the engine.
The 2.0 dCi engine in all its versions complies with the Euro 4 and 5 standards for exhaust emissions. The  New Mégane and New Laguna respectively emitted /km and /km of CO2 and the  version of New Laguna 2.0 dCi emits /km of CO2; they all comply with the Euro 5 standards for exhaust emissions.

In 2011 the  M9R engines has been updated with an optional package to lower exhaust emissions (Euro5) and fuel consumption. These engines are tagged "2.0 Energy dCi 130" resp. "2.0 Energy dCi 150", typically maximum power is available at 3750 rpm and maximum torque at a minimum of 1750 rpm. The package comprises:
Stop & Start
Active thermal management
Smart electrical management
Variable capacity oil pump
The CO2 values were thus reduced to 118 g/km for the Laguna both the 2.0 Energy dCi 130 and 2.0 Energy dCi 150.

Another important innovation introduced with this update was the BluedCi technology, which involves the installation of a small tank of adBlue, a chemical additive that is injected upstream of the catalyst and which, when combined with the exhaust gas, causes a reaction chemistry within the catalyst itself. This reaction transforms most of the nitrogen oxides into harmless nitrogen and water vapor. This engine debuted in two power levels, in the Renault Talisman II 2.0 Blue dCi which was produced from December 2018. In December 2020 a single 190 PS version replaced both of the earlier versions.

The engine is fitted to the following vehicles:
2007–2011 Nissan Qashqai
2007–2012 Nissan X-Trail
2005–2015 Renault Laguna
2006–2015 Renault Mégane
2007–present Renault Koleos
2006–2014 Renault Espace
2007–2010 Renault Vel Satis
2015 Nissan Teana
2006-2014 Vauxhall Vivaro Renault Trafic Nissan Primastar    
2010–present Renault Latitude
2015–present Renault Espace V

M9T 

The M9T is a version specifically designed for light commercial vehicles that is manufactured by Renault in Cléon. Later, it was also introduced to the Nissan Navara and the Mercedes-Benz X-Class. Nissan calls it the YS23 while in Mercedes-Benz vehicles, it is named the OM699. The engines with lower power ratings feature a single fixed geometry turbocharger, while the more powerful versions have a variable-geometry turbocharger or twin-turbochargers. The engines are compliant with the Euro 6 emission regulations.

Applications:

 Mercedes-Benz
 X-Class
 Nissan
 Navara
 NV400
 Terra
 Opel
 Movano
 Renault
 Alaskan
 Master
 Vauxhall
 Movano

See also
List of Nissan engines
List of Renault engines

Weblinks 
 Nissan-Global.com HR/MR Engine Technology Overview

References

MR
MR
Straight-four engines
Diesel engines by model
Gasoline engines by model